Anfisa Serhiyivna Pochkalova (born 1 March 1990) is a Ukrainian épée fencer. She is the 2009 world individual bronze medalist.

Personal life
Pochkalova was born 1 March 1990 in Lviv. She is a student at the Lviv State University of Physical Culture.

Career
Pochkalova learnt fencing in Lviv under Zoriana Savruk, then Andriy Orlykovskyi, who also trained Olympic champion Yana Shemyakina. She won in 2007 a bronze medal at the Cadet European Championships in Novi Sad and a silver medal at the Junior European Championship in Prague. She joined in 2008 the national senior team and took part in her first World championships in Beijing, where Ukraine finished 13th.

In 2009, she earned a bronze medal at the Junior World Championships in Belfast. She was part of the Ukrainian team that won the gold medal at the 2009 Summer Universiade in Belgrade. She reached the semi-final in the senior World Fencing Championships after defeating reigning Olympic champion Britta Heidemann, but fell to Russia's Lyubov Shutova and came away with a bronze medal. She finished the 2008–09 season no.1 in junior rankings and no.26 in senior rankings, a career best as of 2014.

This early success was followed by a dry spell. She took part in the 2012 Summer Olympics in London as a member of the Ukrainian team. They were largely defeated by Russia in the first round and finished last after the classification matches. In the 2012–13 season Pochkalova returned to a top 50 ranking with a table of 16 at the Xuzhou Grand Prix, a quarter-final at the European Championships and a second round at the World Championships. After a disappointing 2013–14 season, she won at Legnano her first World Cup competition after defeating Romania's Ana Maria Brânză in the final.

References

External links
 
  (archive)
 
 
 

1990 births
Living people
Ukrainian female épée fencers
Sportspeople from Lviv
Olympic fencers of Ukraine
Fencers at the 2012 Summer Olympics
Fencers at the 2016 Summer Olympics
Universiade medalists in fencing
Universiade gold medalists for Ukraine
Universiade bronze medalists for Ukraine
Medalists at the 2009 Summer Universiade
Medalists at the 2013 Summer Universiade
Medalists at the 2017 Summer Universiade
20th-century Ukrainian women
21st-century Ukrainian women